Vermont Route 139 (VT 139) is a state highway in the U.S. state of Vermont. VT 139 provides access to the Richford–Abercorn Border Crossing, from which the highway continues as Quebec Route 139.

Route description
VT 139 begins at VT 105 in the unincorporated village of Richford in the town of Richford; VT 105 heads southwest as Main Street and east as Troy Street. VT 139 heads north along Main Street into the Downtown Richford Historic District. The highway crosses the Missisquoi River on a pony truss bridge to a four-way intersection between Main Street, River Street, Town Hill Street, and Province Street; River Street leads to the Pinnacle Road–East Pinnacle Border Crossing. VT 139 turns east onto Province Street, which curves northeast out of the downtown area. The highway has a grade crossing with the Central Maine and Quebec Railway's Newport Subdivision rail line and parallels the rail line to the highway's northern terminus at the Richford–Abercorn Border Crossing at the international border between Vermont and Quebec. The highway continues north from the border crossing as Quebec Route 139 (Chemin des Ormes). which heads toward Abercorn and Cowansville in Brome-Missisquoi Regional County Municipality. The town of Richford maintains the entire length of VT 139.

Major intersections

References

External links

139
Transportation in Franklin County, Vermont
Richford, Vermont